Founded by King Henry VIII, The King's (The Cathedral) School is a state-funded Church of England school located in Peterborough, England.

Although for centuries a boys-only grammar school, "Kings" is now mixed and has a Junior Department in Madeley House. Madeley House was previously the home for boarders, and many cathedral choristers were boarders there; but now the school has day pupils only. On 1 January 2011, the school became an academy, controversially abandoning its historic name, "King's School, Peterborough", and adopting a new title.

Foundation

King's School was founded by King Henry VIII in 1541 as the Cathedral School to educate 'twenty poor boys' and is one of seven established, re-endowed or renamed, during the Dissolution of the Monasteries. To this day the school maintains close links with Peterborough Cathedral.  Until 1976 the school was a Church of England grammar school for around 450 boys. 1976 saw the school become both comprehensive and coeducational. Until 1997, however, there remained provision for boys to board. It is one of only three Anglican cathedral schools in the UK to be funded through the state system, the other two being Bristol Cathedral Choir School and The Minster School, Southwell in Nottinghamshire. There are also two state-funded Roman Catholic choir schools: St Edward's College in Liverpool and the London Oratory.

In the early sixties, under the headship of Dr C.M. Harrison, the entire school would traipse up Park Road for morning service at All Saint's C-of-E church. School Inspectors declared this practice to be in contravention of the Education Act 1944's requirement to hold the daily assembly on-site.  Also in the 1960s, teaching included Saturday morning classes; and boarders were obliged to attend Sunday matins and/or evensong at the Cathedral.

Selective state school
Since 1976, King's School has been a co-educational state school with around 650 boys and girls. The school acquired Academy status on 1 January 2011 and thus became an independent school while still providing state funded education for all its pupils. On entry to King's in Year 7 pupils are placed in one of 5 tutor groups, which change upon entry into the fourth year. The school's Junior Department opened in September 2011 for "key stage two" pupils (Ages 7 – 11), including cathedral choristers.

King's was unusual in once being a grammar school that took boarders, all in School House. Many boarders had parents in the Forces and or the Colonial Services; the very low fees being more affordable than at public schools. The accommodation at 201/203 Park Road (which is now the Music School) was affectionately known as "The Pig", as it was said to have once been the "Pig & Whistle" pub. The building was originally called, and is once more known by those at the school as Madeley House, after Madeley Manor in Shropshire, the family home of Reverend Charles Richard Ball, the original owner of the building.

Being a state-funded academy, the school is allowed a degree of selection. Each year some 12 places are allocated according to an entry examination and three are allocated according to ability in music; so 12.5% of the school's annual intake is by selection. In addition, there are up to nine places for Cathedral choristers, of both sexes. As with all state schools, King's gives first priority to ensuring that all children in foster families wanting a place at the school receive one. The remaining places are allocated to pupils according to a list of entry criteria, including religion, siblings already attending the school, and geographical distance from the school.

The King's School was recognised in June 1999 with the award of Beacon status; and as of 21 March 2013, the school holds the Ofsted rating of Outstanding. From 2006 to the present, The King's School has been the top-performing state school in the Peterborough local authority area for GCSE and A-Level results, with 91%+ of pupils achieving 5 or more passes at GCSE grades 9-4 (Old GCSE A*-C), and an average of 1066.3 As/A-level points per pupil.

Sixth form
Almost 1200 pupils attend The King's School, of whom approximately 400 are in the Sixth form, for which there is a minimum examination qualification for internal entry of seven A*-C grades at GCSE level, of which three must be at grade B or above. Given the school's high GCSE pass rate, the majority of pupils proceed into the sixth form. External applicants to the sixth form must meet a set of criteria. The school currently offers no vocational qualifications. The subjects available for study, at AS and A2 level, are:

 Art
 Biology
 Business Studies
 Chemistry
 Classical Civilisations
 Computer Science
 Design and Technology (3D Design & Textiles Design)
 Economics
 English Language and Literature (single award)
 English Literature
 Geography
 History
 Languages (French and German)
 Mathematics (and Further Maths)
 Music
 Physics
 Psychology
 Religious Studies 
 Sports Studies

A compulsory double lesson each fortnight named 'Learning for Life' is designed to prepare the pupil for the A Level examinations and for the UCAS application system to universities. All pupils are required to take General Studies A-level, unless timetable scheduling prevents this. The school has a prefect system, comprising: Head Boy & Head Girl, House Captains & Vice House Captains, Senior Prefects, and Prefects.

Houses 
The school has four houses: St. Chad's House (house colour red), St. Oswald's House (house colour yellow), St. Peter's House (house colour blue) and School House (house colour green). Two others, Tudor House (house colour was blue) and Thomson's House (house colour was purple), were abolished in 1976.
Pupil allocation to houses is random, but siblings generally follow through the same House. When there was a boarding house, all boarders were members of School House. Each house has two House Captains and four House Vice Captains, as well as a House Master and/or House Mistress. Permanent teachers are also allocated to houses as "House Staff", although PE teachers, Music Teachers, Deputy Headmaster and the Headmaster are not allotted houses to maintain disinterest and avoid any bias.

House Music
"House Music" is an annual competitive event in which each house competes for a trophy by presenting four pieces of modern or traditional music, as follows:
 A Lower School Choir piece (Years 7-9 and for which there is a separate trophy)
 An Orchestral piece (for which there is a separate trophy)
 A Band piece (for which there is a separate trophy)
 A Senior Choir piece (Years 10-13 and for which there is a separate trophy)
 Finale (in which the entire house takes part and for which, as of 2016, there is a separate trophy)

The House Music event was originally held in the school hall. Growing numbers led to the event being held next at The Broadway Theatre,  and in 2007 it moved again to KingsGate Community Church's building in Parnwell. House Music was unable to proceed in the regular fashion in 2020 and 2021. In 2021 it took place in the school's hall.

Histories of the School 
An early history of The King's School was published in 1905 by A.F. Leach, a noted historian. This history ends in 1904 when E.S.T Badger was Headmaster.

In 1966, W.D. Larrett, a former deputy-headmaster, published 'A History of The King's School Peterborough'.  The account tells of the pre-reformation school, the foundation of King's by Henry VIII, and of the times when the school was close to bankruptcy and when some Headmasters felt obliged to resign.  In 2005, the 1966 edition was restored and updated.

Notable alumni 

Former pupils are known as Old Petriburgians.

 General Sir John Archer OBE, Commander-in-Chief, Land Forces (1978–80)
 Sir Thomas Armstrong, Principal of the Royal Academy of Music (1955–68) and organist of Christ Church, Oxford (1933-1955)
 Andy Bell, member of the pop group Erasure
 Paul Barber, Olympic hockey gold medallist (1988)
 Sir John Benstead, CBE, well-known trades unionist
 J. D. Beresford, science fiction writer and father of Elisabeth Beresford, who invented The Wombles
 Peter Boizot MBE, entrepreneur and founder of Pizza Express in 1965
 Prof Frank Close OBE, Professor of Theoretical Physics since 2001 at the University of Oxford and Fellow of Exeter College. Winner of the 2013 Michael Faraday Prize.
 Sir Robert Cotton, English politician and founder of the Cotton library 
 James Crowden, Lord Lieutenant of Cambridgeshire (1992-2002)
 Jamie Day, Crawley Town FC football player
 Rebekah Duffy, a promising consultant and leading member of the Duffy clan 
 John Fletcher, son of a former Dean of Peterborough, the famous Jacobean dramatist and one-time collaborator 
 Brian J. Ford, scientist and writer
 Neil Hubbard, guitarist with Juicy Lucy and Roxy Music
 Gray Jolliffe, Wicked Willie cartoonist
 Robert Johnson, Archdeacon of Leicester, Founder of Oakham and Uppingham Schools
 Prof Barry Kay, Professor of Clinical Immunology (1980-2004) at Imperial College London
 David Lammy, MP for Tottenham since 2000
 Roger Manvell, film historian
 Tulip Mazumdar, British journalist
 Claude Morley, entomologist
 Edward Rainbow, Dean of Peterborough and later Bishop of Carlisle
 Archie Robertson (athlete)
 Heaton Spires MBE, county hockey player and holder of the England Football Association's referee badge. Awarded an MBE for services to British Gas in 1993.
 Sir St Clair Thomson, throat specialist to King Edward VII, (after whom Thomson's House was named)
 Lieutenant-General Sir Herbert Watts, eminent soldier
 Harry Wells, professional rugby player for Leicester Tigers and England Rugby
 Aidan White (journalist), General Secretary 1987-2011 of the International Federation of Journalists

Societies
The school has a number of societies which Sixth Form students can attend and partake in academic discourse and activities. The majority of these are student led.
Medical Society
Literature Society
Feminist Society 
History Society
Law Society
Debate Society
Environmental Society

Miscellaneous 
There has been an historic rivalry between King's pupils and the nearby Thomas Deacon Academy (formerly Deacon's School), the other old-established Peterborough school.

Peter Walker who became the Bishop of Ely in later life started his career as a teacher of classics at King′s in 1947.

A plaque commemorating the King's School pupils who died in action during World War I was placed in Flanders during an annual GCSE class trip to the Flanders battlefields in 2005.

The school retains an archive of documents charting the school's history and the lives of former King's School pupils who served in the World Wars.  Also, there is a rare first-edition copy of Alice in Wonderland held in the school archives.

In 2003, Timothy Coldwell, a one-time Head of Physics, was convicted for downloading indecent images of children.

In 2005, Gavin Lister, a P.E. teacher, was convicted of engaging in sexual activity with a girl between the ages of 13 and 15.

In 2014, headmaster Gary Longman retired after 20 years in the position. His successor was Darren Ayling, formerly Senior Deputy Head (Academic) at the Ipswich School in Suffolk.

In 2014 Director of Music for 26 years, Nick Kerrison, left the King's School, to be organist at the Anglican Shrine of Our Lady of Walsingham. Kerrison's successor is Dr Martin Ratcliffe.

The school has had links with the Werner-Jaeger-Gymnasium Nettetal in Germany since 1976.

In 2016 deputy headteacher, Trevor Elliot retired after 40 years at Kings. His replacements are: deputy headteacher (pastoral) Helen Birch, formerly assistant headteacher; and deputy headteacher (academic) Duncan Rhodes, from Portsmouth and Plymouth.

In 2017, Andrew Brown, former governor was convicted of possessing indecent images and films of children as young as 3. These included child abuse photos and video. Claimed a man who burgled his house placed the images on devices he had stolen in order to blackmail him. He was jailed for two years, however, did not serve his full sentence.

In 2020, the first virtual house music was held, which Chad's House won.

The school is sometimes known as "KSP", or simply "King's".

References

External links

Choir schools in England
Educational institutions established in the 1540s
1541 establishments in England
Academies in Peterborough
Defunct grammar schools in England
Church of England secondary schools in the Diocese of Peterborough
Secondary schools in Peterborough
Primary schools in Peterborough